Florence Public School District One manages the schools in the region around Florence, South Carolina, USA. It is the largest of the school districts in Florence County.

Schools

High schools (Grades 9-12)
 South Florence High School
 West Florence High School
 Wilson High School

Middle schools (Grades 6-8)
 Henry L. Sneed Middle School
 John W. Moore Intermediate School
 Southside Middle School
 Williams Middle School (Florence, SC)

Elementary schools (Grades K-5)
 Briggs Elementary School
 Carver Elementary School
 Delmae Heights Elementary School
 Dewey L. Carter Elementary School
 Greenwood Elementary School
 Henry L. Timrod Elementary School
 Lucy T. Davis Elementary School
 McLaurin Elementary School (Kindergarten-5th grade) (including a Montessori program for ages 3–9)
 North Vista Elementary School (including a Montessori program for ages 3–12)
 Royall Elementary School
 Savannah Grove Elementary School
 Theodore Lester Elementary School
 Wallace Gregg Elementary School

External links
 Official site

School districts in South Carolina
Florence, South Carolina
Education in Florence County, South Carolina